Homestead High School or Homestead Senior High School is the name of several high schools in the United States:

Homestead High School (California)
Homestead Senior High School (Florida)
Homestead High School (Homestead, Pennsylvania), alma mater of American disc jockey Mary Dee and singer Betty Davis
Homestead High School (Indiana)
Homestead High School (Wisconsin)